The ripieno concerto is a somewhat later type of Baroque music, the term concerto here reverting to its earlier meaning of work for an ensemble. The word ripieno is from the Italian for "padding". The  was sometimes referred to as a "" (or "" if the orchestra included two viola parts, a standard scoring in the 17th century). These were merely compositions for the ripieno alone (i.e. for string orchestra and continuo), with either no solo parts or clearly subsidiary ones. Beginning with the six ripieno concertos, Op. 5 (1692), of Giuseppe Torelli, this genre enjoyed an efflorescence that extended until about 1740.

Types
Most ripieno concertos fall into one of two distinct classes: a sonata type and a sinfonia type.

The more modern sinfonia type was firmly established in Torelli's second publication to include concertos, Op. 6 (1698), and in Giulio Taglietti's , Op. 4 (1699), which turn to the three-movement (fast-slow-fast) pattern and more homophonic texture familiar to us from the solo concerto and opera sinfonia. The opening movements also parallel the solo concerto in utilizing ritornello form (without solo sections), in which the opening material recurs from one to several times in various keys, the last statement normally in the tonic. Finales are most often binary in form and dancelike in style. The sinfonia type gradually merged with the early concert symphony beginning in the 1720s, doubtless in part because the term concerto was by that time acquiring an indelible association with the notion of tutti-solo contrast.

A special class of 20th-century concertos is the Concerto for Orchestra. These works are not for the most part ripieno concertos in the Baroque sense but rather display pieces in which the orchestra itself is the virtuoso, from soloists to sections of the orchestra, choirs or tutti. Examples of this genre, best known through Bartók's popular work of 1943, include compositions by Hindemith (1925), Walter Piston (1933), Zoltán Kodály (1939–40), Michael Tippett (1962–63), and Elliott Carter (1969). In the last piece, Carter dramatically personifies or characterizes the various concertino groupings, a technique he had previously explored in his Double Concerto for harpsichord and piano (1961) and his Piano Concerto (1964–65).

References
The New Harvard Dictionary of Music

Concertos
Musical terminology
Italian words and phrases